Epiclea is a genus of moths belonging to the family Limacodidae. Its exact sub-family has not currently been determined. The genus is found in Central America.

Species
Epiclea elaea (Druce, 1887)

References

 , 1996: A new species and generic placement for the misidentified type species of Epiclea Dyar, 1905 (Lepidoptera: Limacodidae). Proceedings of the Entomological Society of Washington 98 (4): 812-817.

Limacodidae genera
Limacodidae